Methyl ether may refer to:

 Any chemical compound of the ether class that includes a methyl group
 Dimethyl ether, often simply called methyl ether

See also
Methoxy group, –OCH3